Districts are the second-level administrative divisions of Myanmar. They are the sub-divisions of the States and Regions of Myanmar. According to the Myanmar Information Management Unit (MIMU), as of December 2015, there are 76 districts in Myanmar, which in turn are subdivided into townships, then towns, wards and villages.

The District's role is more supervisory as the Townships are the basic administrative unit of local governance. A District is led by a District Administrator, a civil servant appointed through the General Administration Department (GAD) of the Ministry of Home Affairs (MOHA). The Minister of Home Affairs is to be appointed by the military according to the 2008 constitution. 

Here is a list of districts of Myanmar by state/region:

List of districts by state or region

See also

 Administrative divisions of Myanmar
 List of cities in Myanmar

References

External links 
 
 
 "Burma Second Order Administrative Divisions" The Permanent Committee on Geographical Names for British Official Use

 
Subdivisions of Myanmar
Districts
Burma 2
Districts, Myanmar